During the 2006–07 season, the Scottish football club Gretna F.C. finished at the top of the Scottish First Division with 19 wins and 9 draws out of 36 matches, and won promotion to the Scottish Premier League only 5 years after joining the SFL on the last day of the season beating Ross County 3–2 to clinch the First Division title. The team reached the quarterfinals of the Scottish Challenge Cup and the fourth round of the Scottish Cup.

Results

Scottish First Division

Final Table

UEFA Cup

Scottish Challenge Cup

Scottish League Cup

Scottish Cup

References

Gretna F.C. seasons
Gretna